Eastern North Carolina School for the Deaf  (ENCSD) is a public school for the deaf in Wilson, North Carolina. Its service area is defined by the state as the 54 counties to the east.

There were parents in the east of the state wishing for their deaf children to have a school closer than the North Carolina School for the Deaf. A bill to establish the school passed in 1960, and a referendum to fund it passed in 1961. R.M. McAdams became the first superintendent effective October 1963. In January 1964 the authorities began preparing the facility, with the school itself opening in August and with dormitories opening in spring 1965. The initial group of students numbered 88. Under desegregation, black deaf students from the Garner campus of Governor Morehead School were moved to ENCSD.

The school has dormitory facilities. About 121 soldiers of the Seymour Johnson Air Force Base repainted them in 2016.

See also
 Governor Morehead School for the Blind

References

Further reading
 2015 North Carolina General Statutes Chapter 116 - Higher Education. Article 11A - Eastern North Carolina School for the Deaf and North Carolina School for the Deaf at Morganton.

External links
 Eastern North Carolina School for the Deaf

Schools for the deaf in the United States
Public boarding schools in the United States
Wilson, North Carolina
Boarding schools in North Carolina
Public K-12 schools in the United States
Public high schools in North Carolina
Public middle schools in North Carolina